St. Petersburg, Florida is the fifth largest city in Florida with a population of 263,768 as of 2017. The city is home to 74 completed high rises (as of 2018), and the most notable are the One St. Petersburg, Priatek Plaza and Signature Place skyscrapers.

The current tallest skyscraper in the city is the One St. Petersburg. The second tallest building is the Priatek Plaza, formally known as One Progress Plaza and the Bank of America Tower. The Signature Place tower has been credited for being a major transition in St. Petersburg modern architecture and surviving the financial crisis of 2008's house market crash.

St. Petersburg has recently seen an economic boom in luxury condos dating from the 1990s to early and late 2000s. The combination of tourism and wealthy residents attracted wanted large and mid sized condominiums.

Tallest buildings 
This is the list of the tallest buildings in St. Petersburg, Florida that are multi-leveled and above . The (=) sign stands for buildings with the same height as another.

See also 

 List of tallest buildings in Florida
 List of tallest buildings in Fort Lauderdale
 List of tallest buildings in Jacksonville
 List of tallest buildings in Miami
 List of tallest buildings in Miami Beach
 List of tallest buildings in Orlando
 List of tallest buildings in Sunny Isles Beach
 List of tallest buildings in Tampa

References 

St. Petersburg
Tallest in St. Petersburg
Buildings and structures in St. Petersburg, Florida